The 1929 College Football All-America team is composed of college football players who were selected as All-Americans by various organizations and writers that chose College Football All-America Teams in 1929. The seven selectors recognized by the NCAA as "official" for the 1929 season are (1) Collier's Weekly, as selected by Grantland Rice, (2) the Associated Press, (3) the United Press, (4) the All-America Board, (5) the International News Service (INS), (6) the Newspaper Enterprise Association (NEA), and (7) the North American Newspaper Alliance (NANA).

Consensus All-Americans

Following the death of Walter Camp in 1925, there was a proliferation of All-American teams in the late 1920s. For the year 1929, the NCAA recognizes seven published All-American teams as "official" designations for purposes of its consensus determinations. Only two players, Notre Dame quarterback Frank Carideo and Pittsburgh end Joe Donchess, were unanimous first-team selections on all seven of the NCAA-recognized teams. The following chart identifies the NCAA-recognized consensus All-Americans and displays which first-team designations they received.

All-American selections for 1929

Ends
 Joe Donchess, Pittsburgh (College Football Hall of Fame) (AP-1; UP-1; COL-1; NEA-1; INS-1; NANA-1; NYS-1; NYP-1; AAB-1; DW-1; LP-1; WT)
 Wes Fesler, Ohio State (College Football Hall of Fame) (AP-1; UP-2; NEA-2; INS-1; CP-1; NYS-2; NYP-2; DW-2; WT)
 Francis Tappaan, USC (AP-2; UP-1; NEA-1; INS-2; NANA-1; CP-2; NYS-2; NYP-1; AAB-1; DW-2)
 Wear Schoonover, Arkansas (College Football Hall of Fame) (AP-3; UP-2; COL-1; INS-3; NYS-1; DW-3; LP-1)
 Robert Tanner, Minnesota (NEA-2; NYP-2; DW-1)
 Vernon Smith, Georgia (College Football Hall of Fame) (AP-2; NEA-3)
 Paul L. Bates, Western Maryland (UP-3)
 Tom Churchill, Oklahoma (UP-3; NEA-3)
 Frank Baker, Northwestern (AP-3; NANA-2)
 Dale Van Sickel, Florida (College Football Hall of Fame) (CP-2)
 Mitchell, Davis & Elkins (DW-3)
 Norton, California (INS-2; NANA-3)
 Muller, Stanford (INS-3)
 Herster Barres, Yale (NANA-2)
 Tom Conley, Notre Dame (NANA-3)

Tackles
 Bronko Nagurski, Minnesota (College and Pro Football Hall of Fame) (AP-1; UP-1; COL-1; NEA-1; INS-1; NANA-1; CP-1 [fb]; NYS-1; NYP-1 [fb]; DW-2 [fb]; LP-1)
 Elmer Sleight, Purdue (AP-1; UP-2; COL-1; INS-1; NANA-2; CP-1; NYS-1; NYP-1; AAB-1; DW-1; LP-1; WT)
 Marion Hammon, SMU (UP-1; NYS-2; DW-2)
 George Ackerman, St. Mary’s (NYP-2; AAB-1; DW-1)
 Forrest Douds, Washington & Jefferson (AP-3; UP-2; NEA-2; INS-2; CP-1; WT)
 Fred Sington, Alabama (College Football Hall of Fame) (AP-3; UP-2 [g]; INS-2 [g]; NYP-1; DW-2 [g])
 Ray Richards, Nebraska (NEA-1; DW-3)
 Lou Gordon, Illinois (NEA-2; NANA-1)
 Samuel Wakeman, Cornell (AP-2; UP-3; NEA-3; INS-2; NANA-2; CP-2; NYP-2; DW-3)
 Ted Twomey, Notre Dame (AP-2; UP-3; INS-3; DW-2)
 John Utz, Penn (CP-2)
 Huntington, Colgate (NYS-2)
 Shields, Oregon (NEA-3)
 Barfield, Princeton (NANA-3)
 Blimp Bowstrom, Navy (NANA-3)

Guards
 Jack Cannon, Notre Dame (College Football Hall of Fame) (AP-1; UP-1; COL-1; NEA-1; INS-1; NANA-3; CP-2; NYS-1; NYP-1; AAB-1; DW-1; LP-1; WT)
 Ray Montgomery, Pittsburgh (AP-2; UP-1; COL-1; NEA-1; INS-1; NANA-2; NYS-2; AAB-1; DW-1)
 Bert Schwarz, California (AP-1; UP-2; INS-3; NYS-1; DW-2; LP-1)
 Wade Greene, Yale (AP-2; CP-1; WT)
 Russ Crane, Illinois (CP-1)
 Mike Brumbelow, TCU (UP-3; NEA-3; DW-3)
 Fred Roberts, Iowa (UP-3)
 John B. Law, Notre Dame (AP-3)
 Ray Farris, North Carolina (AP-3; NEA-2)
 Nate Barragar, USC (INS-2; CP-2; DW-3)
 Gibson, Colgate (NYP-2)
 Luby DiMeolo, Pitt (INS-3 [t]; NYP-2)
 Bull Brown, Vanderbilt (NYS-2; NANA-1)
 Thomas A. Driscoll, Stanford (NEA-2)
 Paul Schwegler, Washington (College Football Hall of Fame) (NEA-3)
 Henry J. Anderson, Northwestern (INS-3; NANA-1)
 Weir, Illinois (NANA-2)
 Charles Humber, Army (NANA-3)

Centers
 Ben Ticknor, Harvard (College Football Hall of Fame) (AP-1; UP-1; COL-1; NEA-3; INS-1; NANA-1; CP-2; NYS-1; NYP-1 [g]; AAB-1; DW-1; LP-1; WT)
 Roy Riegels, California (AP-2; NEA-1; INS-3; CP-1)
 Walter Heinecke, Stanford (UP-2; NANA-3; NYS-2; DW-2)
 Tony Slano, Fordham (AP-3; UP-3; NEA-2; NANA-2; NYP-1)
 Tim Moynihan, Notre Dame (NYP-2)
 Marvin Jonas, Utah (DW-3)

Quarterbacks
 Frank Carideo, Notre Dame (College Football Hall of Fame) (AP-1; UP-1; COL-1; NEA-1; INS-1; NANA-1; CP-1; NYS-1; NYP-1; AAB-1; DW-1; LP-1; WT)
 Alton Marsters, Dartmouth (AP-2; INS-1 [hb]; NANA-1; CP-2; NYS-1 [hb]; NYP-2)
 Glen Harmeson, Purdue (UP-3; INS-3; NEA-3 [fb])
 Albie Booth, Yale (AP-3; INS-3 [hb]; NYS-2; NYP-1 [hb]; DW-3 [hb])
 Saunders, USC (NEA-3; NANA-3)
 Barry Wood, Harvard (College Football Hall of Fame) (INS-2; NANA-2; NYP-2)

Halfbacks
 Red Cagle, Army (College Football Hall of Fame) (AP-1; UP-2 [qb]; COL-1; NEA-2 [qb]; INS-2; NANA-2; CP-2; NYS-2; NYP-2; AAB-1; DW-1; WT)
 Gene McEver, Tennessee (College Football Hall of Fame) (AP-2; UP-1; NEA-1; NANA-1; CP-1; NYP-2; DW-3)
 Willis Glassgow, Iowa (UP-2; COL-1; NEA-1; NYS-1; DW-3 [fb]; LP-1)
 Toby Uansa, Pitt (AP-1; UP-3; NEA-2; INS-2; NANA-3; CP-1; WT)
 Bill Banker, Tulane (AP-3; UP-3 [fb]; NEA-2; INS-3; NYP-1; AAB-1; DW-1; LP-1)
 Merle Hufford, Washington (UP-1)
 Fred "Stud" Stennett, St. Mary's (UP-2)
 Cy Leland, TCU (UP-3)
 Benny Lom, California (AP-3; NEA-2 [fb]; NANA-2)
 Lloyd Brazil, Detroit (NEA-3; INS-3 [fb]; DW-2 [qb])
 Dick Boyle, St. Mary's (NEA-3)
 Wittmer, Princeton (NANA-3)

Fullbacks
 Ralph Welch, Purdue (AP-2 [hb]; UP-1; COL-1; NEA-1; INS-1 [hb]; NANA-1; CP-2 [hb]; NYS-2 [hb]; AAB-1; DW-2 [hb])
 Pug Parkinson, Pitt (AP-2; UP-2; INS-1; NANA-2; NYS-1; NYP-2; DW-2 [hb]; LP-1; WT)
 Tony Holm, Alabama (AP-1; INS-2)
 Earl "Powerhouse" Pomeroy, Utah (AP-3; DW-1)
 C. Russell Bergherm, Northwestern (NANA-3; CP-2; NYS-2)

Key

Selectors recognized by NCAA

Other selectors

See also
 1929 All-Big Six Conference football team
 1929 All-Big Ten Conference football team
 1929 All-Pacific Coast Conference football team
 1929 All-Southern football team
 1929 All-Southwest Conference football team

References

All-America Team
College Football All-America Teams